Imaginator is the third album from American rock group Nelson. It was released in Japan through Victor Entertainment in 1996, and later in the US through Fuel 2000 in 1998.

The album is notable for being the second album recorded by the band, after the success of their debut album, After the Rain. The album was planned to be released around 1993. However, the album was rejected by  producer John Kalodner and the executives at Geffen Records for being too heavy and dark. They gave the band the choice to either record another album, or they would be released from their contract. The band decided to return to the studio again and recorded a third album, Because They Can, which ended up being released by Geffen in 1995. The band broke up with Geffen shortly after the release of that album and released Imaginator through a deal with Victor.

Concept and recording 

After the success of their first album, After the Rain, and years of touring, Nelson returned to the studio to record their second album. Gunnar Nelson has said on interviews that they were "a little angry too because the whole music industry seemed to change, as well as our own label", referring to how labels and audiences were moving away from the music style that had made them popular at first.

They came up with a concept album that Nelson described as "really dark and brooding and angry". Gunnar described the concept as being "about the machine that is the media. That same machine that built us up and was also ready to tear us down". The album comments on society's dependence on technology and media to make decisions, and how people should take control of their lives and their choices.

Gunnar has also said the band wanted to prove their musicianship and showcase the talent of each member. He has said that the sound of the album is a representation of their live sound at the time.

According to Gunnar Nelson, Imaginator was recorded "in isolation" and nobody from Geffen was involved in the process. He has said that producer John Kalodner was "too busy making Aerosmith records" and he never visited the studio during the recording, so they decided to continue recording the album they had envisioned, hoping he would like it in the end. He also referred to the process as a "creative catharsis" saying that they felt they were under attack and they were "exorcising our demons, and we brought it into Geffen".

Production began August–September 1992 at Granny's House Recording Studio in Reno, NV.  Demos were tracked previously at Cherokee Studios in LA, CA.  The album was recorded and co-produced by David Holmann who had recorded Olivia Newton-John, Little River Band, Bush and No Doubt.  Several tracks originally recorded never ended up on the ultimate release of either the "Imaginator" or "Because They Can" records.

Rejection by Geffen

When the band presented Imaginator to John Kalodner and the executives at Geffen, they weren't pleased with it. According to Gunnar Nelson, it "scared the hell out of [them] and basically they wanted to distance themselves from it as
quickly as possible". Gunnar referred to it as "a very uncomfortable meeting". The executives at Geffen gave the band the choice to either record another album, more according to what they were expecting, or they would be released from their contract.

On interviews, Gunnar Nelson has compared the album to Metallica's 1991 self-titled album, arguing that Geffen could've had a similar success with Imaginator, if they had released it. However, he says that Geffen was seemingly expecting "After the Rain, Pt. II".

Although the band was frustrated by the reaction at Geffen, they decided to return to the studio to record another album. The result was Because They Can, which was released in 1995. Shortly after, the band broke up with Geffen.

Release

After parting ways with Geffen, Nelson established their own label called Stone Canyon Records. In 1996, they released Imaginator through a partnership with Victor Entertainment in Japan. The album was finally released in the United States in 1998.

Track listing

Personnel

Musicians
 Matthew Nelson – vocals, bass
 Gunnar Nelson – vocals, guitar
 Paul Mirkovich – keyboards, vocals
 Bobby Rock – drums
 Brett Garsed – guitar
 Joey Cathcart – guitar, vocals

References 

1996 albums
Nelson (band) albums